Ambalamkunnu is a small temple town in the Indian state of Kerala. It is situated 25 kilometers from Kollam, located at 76.90 °E 9.00 °N. It's a hilly area and houses a large number of temples.
Some of the temples: Valiya Vila Bhagavathy temple, Nettayam Indilayappa swami temple, Meeyanakkavu Devi temple, Kayila Madan Kavu, Cheruvakkal Dharma Saastha temple, Vaaliyode Madan temple, Nelliparampu Sreekrishna Swami temple.

Some of the nearby places are Kottarakara, Roaduvila, Odanavattom, Oyoor, Kottiyam, Chathannoor Anchal, Kulathupuzha , Pooyapally, Veliyam and Punalur.

The main agricultural products of surrounding areas are rubber, rice , wheat black pepper and other spices.

Religion
The majority of the population belongs to the Hindu religion(60%). The town also has a sizable Muslim(30%) population and the Christian population is around 10%. Among Hindus, Ezhava caste forms the dominant community with 70% of Hindus. The rest are Nairs(17%), Viswakarmas(5%), Harijan(5%). Others form 3%.

Festivals
The famous festival here is Onam. It's celebrated by all people regardless of their caste and religion. The main festivals among Hindus are Deepavali, vishu and the Karthika festival. Muslims celebrate Valiya Perunnal, Cheriya Perunnal and Nabi Jayanthi. Christmas is celebrated not only by Christians but also by some sections of Hindus too.

References

Cities and towns in Kollam district